A by-election was held for the New South Wales Legislative Assembly electorate of Queanbeyan on 13 April 1910. The by-election was triggered by the resignation of Granville Ryrie to unsuccessfully contest the 1910 federal election for Werriwa.

The by-election and those for Darling Harbour and Upper Hunter were held on the same day as the 1910 Federal election.

Dates

Results

Granville Ryrie resigned to unsuccessfully contest the 1910 federal election for Werriwa.

See also
Electoral results for the district of Queanbeyan
List of New South Wales state by-elections

Notes

References

New South Wales state by-elections
1910 elections in Australia
1910s in New South Wales